Barrio La Lucha is a barrio of La Paz in the Canelones Department of southern Uruguay.

Geography

Location
The barrio is located on the west side of the city, just north of Barrio Cópola.

Population
In 2011 Barrio La Lucha had a population of 492.
 
Source: Instituto Nacional de Estadística de Uruguay

References

External links
INE map of La Paz, Barrio Cópola, Costa y Guillamón, Villa Paz S.A. and Barrio La Lucha

Populated places in the Canelones Department